Traditional Phenological Knowledge can be seen as a "subset of Indigenous Knowledge". Traditional Phenological Knowledge as known as TPK, can be useful for the management of naturally occurring phenomenon, as well as "adaptive management" such as fire management. TPK encompasses history, observations and Traditional Knowledge (TK) or Indigenous Knowledge (IK). Knowledge along with sustainable interaction with the land. Indigenous knowledge with regards to the land is seen as "long-term interaction and respectful, sustainable relationships with the natural world, and interactive processes focussed on learning-by-doing." Indigenous Knowledge is ever-flowing meaning it is flexible and always evolves. It considers the past, present and future of generations.

TPK is integrative and interactive. It can fall in the same teachings of Traditional Ecological Knowledge also known as TEK. Both TPK and TEK share close ties in the natural and environmental approach of IK.

Phenology in TPK can be qualitative and quantitative. Observations can be described, passed through oral histories and/or be measured scientifically. These ways of measuring can be used as a "benchmark from which change in phenological events can be measured" (cit Nabhari, 2010). Additionally, TPK can be "direct" or "indirect". Direct observations of phenology in TPK can refer to species signals and timings of secondary species.

Phenology

Traditional Phenological Knowledge and Phenology 
TPK has strong ties to the science of Phenology. For instance, plants, cycles revolving the seasons or seasonality, animals, animal behaviour, weather patterns and climate. As Swartz defines; "Phenology is the study of recurring plant, fungi and animal life cycle stages, especially as they relate to climate and weather" (cit Swartz, 2013).

Phenological Processes 
Phenology is described as a process that revolves around the development of an organism ( plants or animals) in relation to the change of the seasons. Moreover, temperature is a factor in these processes that create changes in the cycles. For instance, species are "triggered by accumulated hea, or exceedance of temperature threshold, can also serve as indicators of seasonal variation and proxies to monitor the biological effect of climate change".

Sustainability and Biodiversity 
Conservation of the land is engrained in indigenous knowledge. Practises of indigenous knowledge can be useful for sustainability and solutions for modern day environmental issues regarding climate change and biodiversity loss. TPK always looking at indigenous ways of environmental and traditional practice. TEK, TK, IK are ways to look at landscape ecology in a method that also scientists and the general public can learn from. Many practises can aid sustainable practises and fights against climate change.

Barriers and Challenges 
Some of the barriers of TPK would be that some institutions do not recognise TPK as a scientific way of practice due to Western ways of teaching. This is can be due to priority of importance of the institutions and education systems put in place.

References 

Source: Concordia Library

Form: Peer Reviewed

 Challenges in the Identification and Interpretation of Phenological Shifts: Anthropogenic Influences on Adult Migration Timing in Salmonids
 Disorder or a new order: How climate change affects phenological variability
 Climate- and Disturbance-Driven Changes in Subsistence Berries in Coastal Alaska: Indigenous Knowledge to Inform Ecological Inference
 Indian time: time, seasonality, and culture in Traditional Ecological Knowledge of climate change
 Opportunities to utilize traditional phenological knowledge to support adaptive management of social-ecological systems vulnerable to changes in climate and fire regimes.

Wikipedia Student Program